Lee James Palmer (born 19 September 1970) is an English former professional footballer. His clubs included Gillingham, where he made 120 Football League appearances, Cambridge United, Woking, Dover Athletic and Folkestone Invicta.

References

1970 births
Footballers from Croydon
Living people
English footballers
Association football defenders
Gillingham F.C. players
Sittingbourne F.C. players
Cambridge United F.C. players
Woking F.C. players
Dover Athletic F.C. players
Folkestone Invicta F.C. players
English Football League players